La Motte is a municipality in the Canadian province of Quebec, located in the Abitibi Regional County Municipality and the administrative region of Abitibi-Témiscamingue.

As of 2013, the town did not have a restaurant or inn. In preparation for the potential media influx due to the papability of Cardinal Ouellet after the resignation of pope Benedict XVI, an old church basement had been converted into a media centre.

Geography 

The village of La Motte is located midway between the city of Amos (distance of 27.5 km) and city of Malartic (distance of 30.5 km). The Provincial road 109 crosses the municipal territory north to south. The village of La Motte is located 80.7 km from the city of Rouyn-Noranda and 57.2 km from Val d'Or. The Harricana River which is the eastern boundary of the municipal territory includes at the height of La Motte two bulges forming large lakes in the area: the Lake Malartic southeast and the lake La Motte at northeast. Access to the village of La Motte is by Highway 117 connecting Val d'Or and Rouyn-Noranda, or by the road 111 linking Val d'Or to Amos.

The municipal area of La Motte straddles the watershed between the basin of the James Bay (Eastern part of the territory of La Motte) and watershed Saint Lawrence River (western). In the early 19th century, colonization of the territory gained strength thanks to the arrival of the Transcontinental railway in Amos in 1913, linking Abitibi to Quebec city. The railway, which passes through Hervey-Jonction (Middle Mauricie), La Tuque (Haute-Mauricie) and Senneterre (Abitibi) generated a considerable influx of settlers across the North West Quebec.

Toponymy 

In the Abitibi area the village of "La Motte" has four namesakes: La Motte Township, the municipality of La Motte, La Motte lake (formed by a widening of the Harricana River) and the Bay of La Motte (located on the lake in the town of Malartic La Motte). The name of the municipality was chosen in honor of  Guillaume-Jérôme Vacquier de Lamothe, a French army officer who served under Louis-Joseph de Montcalm; he had been a captain in the regiment of Béarn in Montcalm's army.

Demographics
Population trend:
 Population in 2011: 457 (2006 to 2011 population change: 15.7%)
 Population in 2006: 395
 Population in 2001: 406
 Population in 1996: 409
 Population in 1991: 415

Private dwellings occupied by usual residents: 191 (total dwellings: 236)

Mother tongue:
 English as first language: 0%
 French as first language: 100%
 English and French as first language: 0%
 Other as first language: 0%

Multipurpose community center 

Inaugurated on June 2, 2011, the community center of La Motte was built within the walls of the old church of Saint-Luc (built in 1937). Purchased for $1 by the municipality in 2005, the building which was renovated at the level of $260,000 includes a multipurpose room (Heritage room with a stage for public shows) formed in the nave (ground floor) for public events with 300-seat and Pioneers room in the basement with 150 seats, with a well equipped kitchen. These rooms are used for publics meetings, presentations, exhibitions, weddings, entertainment ... The choir retains its authenticity especially the religious celebration of baptisms, funerals, masses, weddings and other important religious events. A grid and a retractable curtain separates the nave of this section for worship. Calendar of events in community center is available on the official website of the municipality.

Windows and woodwork of the old church have been carefully restored. The former sacristy was subdivided with a section dedicated to the needs of the factory of the Saint-Luc parish. A nonprofit committee manages this Community Centre. Over 3,000 volunteer hours were devoted to the restoration of the building for its new multi-functional vocation. This restoration is a model of integration of religious heritage in order to respond to community needs.

Municipal council
 Mayor: René Martineau
 Councillors: Jean-Marc Albert, Claude Hardy, Léopold Larouche, Jocelyne Lefebvre, Oliver Lemieux, Jocelyne Wheelhouse

Notable people
 Cardinal Marc Ouellet of the Roman Catholic Church was born in La Motte on June 8, 1944.

References

Municipalities in Quebec
Incorporated places in Abitibi-Témiscamingue